Uganda became an independent sovereign state on 9 October 1962. The British monarch, Elizabeth II, remained head of state as Queen of Uganda until the link with the British monarchy was severed on 9 October 1963 and the Kabaka (King) of Buganda, Sir Edward Mutesa II, became the first President of Uganda.

Direct British rule of the Uganda Protectorate ended in 1962 with the Uganda Independence Act, which granted independence of the protectorate under the name "Uganda" but retained the British monarch, Elizabeth II, as nominal head of state and Queen of Uganda. Her constitutional roles as head of state were mostly delegated to the Governor-General of Uganda Sir Walter Coutts, who was the only holder of the office.

Milton Obote held office as prime minister and head of government.

In 1963, Uganda adopted a new constitution which abolished the links with the British monarchy. Uganda became a republic within the Commonwealth. However, the new Ugandan state was deliberately referred to as a state rather than a republic, and the constituent native kingdoms (such as Buganda) continued in existence. The description "State" implied that the country was not a republic but instead a federation of tribal kingdoms. Following the proclamation of the State of Uganda on 9 October 1963, the Kabaka (King) of Buganda, Edward Mutesa II, became the first President of Uganda. Uganda did not become a republic de jure until 1966 with Obote's conflict with President Edward Mutesa II.

References

External links

Former Commonwealth realms
Government of Uganda
Political history of Uganda
Uganda and the Commonwealth of Nations
Monarchy
1962 establishments in Uganda
1963 disestablishments in Africa